Games played (most often abbreviated as G or GP) is a statistic used in team sports to indicate the total number of games in which a player has participated (in any capacity); the statistic is generally applied irrespective of whatever portion of the game is contested. In baseball, the statistic applies also to players who, before a game, are included on a starting lineup card or are announced as ex ante substitutes, whether or not they play, although, in Major League Baseball, the application of this statistic does not extend to consecutive games played streaks. A starting pitcher, then, may be credited with a game played even as he is not credited with a game started or an inning pitched.

Ty Cobb was the first player to reach 3,000 games played. Cobb's record of 3,035 games played lasted for 46 seasons until Hank Aaron would break the record. Aaron's record was subsequently broken by Carl Yastrzemski in 1983 and finally broken the following season by Pete Rose, who currently holds the record for most games played at 3,562. Rickey Henderson, Eddie Murray, Stan Musial, Albert Pujols, Willie Mays, and Cal Ripken Jr. are the only other players to play in over 3,000 career games.

Key

List

Stats updated as of the end of the 2022 season.

Notes

References
MLB official list

Games played
Major League Baseball statistics